Luis Alberto Flores Medina (Ayabaca, October 11, 1899 — Lima, May 28, 1969) was a Peruvian lawyer, politician and diplomat. He was the Supreme Chief of the Revolutionary Union, a fascist party modelled after its italian counterpart, after the assassination of the party's founder, Luis Miguel Sánchez Cerro. He also served as a deputy for Lima and as Senator for Piura and Minister of Navy and Aviation, Government and Police and President of the Council of Ministers of Peru.

Early life
Flores was born in Ayabaca, Piura, on October 11, 1899. He grew up in a neighbourhood popular for its cuisine known as "La Mangachería", and took part in right-wing academic circles growing up.

Political career
Flores was part of Luis Miguel Sánchez Cerro's cabinet, as well as an urrista, i.e. a member of his political party, Revolutionary Union. Under Sánchez Cerro, Flores served as Prime Minister, and Minister of Government and Police (1932), as well as Minister of Navy and Aviation (1933) and member of Congress (1931–1936). After Sánchez Cerro's assassination, he took over his political party and modelled it after Italian fascism.

After the anullment of the 1936 Peruvian general election, Flores and his party reportedly planned a coup d'état which was discovered, leading to his exile in Chile, where he supported himself using the funds he gained from his hacienda in Cajamarca.

Later life
Flores returned to Peru in the early 1940s and reorganized his political party, which never achieved the same results it reached in 1936.

He later served as deputy for his native Piura, as well as ambassador of Peru in Italy and Paraguay, where he made comments in support of the Hispanidad.

He died in Lima on May 28, 1969.

References

1899 births
1969 deaths
Peruvian lawyers
People from Piura Region
Peruvian Ministers of Interior
Prime Ministers of Peru
National University of San Marcos alumni
Revolutionary Union (Peru) politicians
Candidates for President of Peru
Ambassadors of Peru to Italy